The 1951 winners of the Torneo di Viareggio (in English, the Viareggio Tournament, officially the Viareggio Cup World Football Tournament Coppa Carnevale), the annual youth football tournament held in Viareggio, Tuscany, are listed below.

Format
The four foreign teams have been spared the initiali knockout round and started directly in the Round of 8. All game were single tie.

Participating teams

Italian teams

  Atalanta
  Bologna
  Fiorentina
  Inter Milan
  Lazio
  Milan
  Sampdoria
  Viareggio

European teams

  Partizan Beograd
  Dinamo Zagreb
  First Vienna
  Racing Paris

Tournament fixtures

Champions

Footnotes

External links
 Official Site (Italian)
 Results on RSSSF.com

1951
1950–51 in Italian football
1950–51 in French football
1950–51 in Yugoslav football
1950–51 in Austrian football